Abi Roberts is a Welsh stand-up comedian and political commentator. She has performed publicly as early as 2007 and has more recently appeared on GB News on numerous occasions.

Early life 
Roberts was Born in Cardiff and studied Russian and Italian at Swansea University. Additionally, she also attended the Bristol Old Vic Theatre School and later the Moscow Conservatoire.

Career 
She has appeared in a series of comedy sketch shows on the London stage and at the Edinburgh Festival. She has appeared in several satirical comedies, such as: Newsrevue, Eve Ensler's The Vagina Monologues and Jonathan Harvey's stage show, Taking Charlie.

Roberts has been a regular on the stand-up comedy circuit's major clubs since 2011 and has performed across the UK and the US. She has appeared as a guest comedian on several radio stations, and appeared in the films One Under and The Honeymoon for Square Cat Films and Bucketless for Sky Arts.

In February 2016, she became the first UK comic to perform in Russia, and in Russian. She has made several appearances on GB News, as well as Good Morning Britain.

Views 
In June 2021, Roberts claimed that her agent dropped her for being a trans-exclusionary radical feminist (or TERF). She is a Christian.

References

External links
Personal website

Year of birth missing (living people)
Welsh women comedians
Living people
Welsh actresses